Solomon Joseph ben Nathan Carpi (born December 27, 1715) was an Italian Jewish writer.

He engaged in the controversy with regard to 's book on Shabbethai Zevi, writing an attack on it, extracts from which were published by N. Brüll under the title Toledot Shabbethai Zevi (Vilna, 1879).

References
 

1715 births
18th-century Italian Jews
Jewish Italian writers